John Archibald "Jack" McIntyre (September 8, 1930 in Brussels, Ontario – March 15, 1998) was a Canadian ice hockey player. He played in the National Hockey League between 1950 and 1960.

Playing career
McIntyre played 499 National Hockey League games as an offensive defenceman for the Boston Bruins, Chicago Black Hawks and Detroit Red Wings. Following his retirement he coached the London Nationals (later Knights) in the Ontario Hockey League.

In his early professional career Jack played left wing for the Boston Bruins as number 18.

Career statistics

Regular season and playoffs

External links

1930 births
1998 deaths
Boston Bruins players
Boston Olympics players
Buffalo Bisons (AHL) players
Canadian ice hockey defencemen
Canadian expatriate ice hockey players in the United States
Canadian ice hockey coaches
Chicago Blackhawks players
Cincinnati Wings players
Detroit Red Wings players
Edmonton Flyers (WHL) players
Hershey Bears players
Ice hockey people from Ontario
Johnstown Jets players
London Knights coaches
Ontario Hockey Association Senior A League (1890–1979) players
People from Huron County, Ontario
Pittsburgh Hornets players
St. Catharines Teepees players